The 2007–08 Al-Shabab FC season was the 60th season of competitive football played by Al Shabab KSA. The club ended the campaign third in the Saudi Premier League. Al-Shabab reached the semi finals of the 2007–08 Saudi Crown Prince Cup and was knocked out by an own goal by Faisal Al Obeli. In the Federation Cup (Prince Faisal Cup), the club also reached the semi finals which end in a draw and lost the penalty kicks 5–4. The club won the 2008 King Cup of Champions.

Saudi Premier League 2007-08

Crown Prince Cup

Round of 16

Quarterfinal

Semi-final

Federation Cup (Prince Faisal Cup)

Group stage

Semi-final

 Al Shabab lost in penalty kicks 5–4.

Saudi Champions Cup

Quarter-final

Semi-final

Final

References

Al Shabab FC (Riyadh) seasons
Saudi Arabian football clubs 2007–08 season